The Insurance Institute of India is the sole national apex body for insurance underwriters in India established in 1955 in Mumbai. . It was created for the purpose of regulation and licensing of insurance underwriting profession in India. The institute conducts examinations at various levels. It is the professional institute in India devoted solely to insurance-underwriting education.

Certificates and diplomas are awarded by the institute to successful candidates. These are recognised by the government of India, the Insurance Regulatory and Development Authority), and insurers in India and abroad. These qualifications are recognised by similar institutes in the UK, Canada and the United States, for grant of exemption from some of their papers. The Sri Lanka Insurance Institute and the Royal Insurance Corporation of Bhutan are also affiliated to the institute.

References

External links
Insurance Institute of India Official website of Insurance Institute of India
Insurance Institute of India More information on Insurance Institute of India.

Financial services companies established in 1955
Companies based in Mumbai
Insurance schools in India
1955 establishments in Bombay State